Deanne   , sometimes styled "DeAnne", is a feminine given name. Notable people with the name include:

Deanne Bell (born c. 1980), American reality television show host
Deanne Bergsma (born 1941), retired South African ballerina
Deanne Bray (born 1971), American deaf actress
DeAnne Julius (born 1949), American-British economist
Deanne Lundin, American poet and short story writer
Deanna Wiener (born 1953), American politician
Stacy-Deanne (born 1978), American author
Deanne Pandey (born 1968),Indian wellness coach and author
Deanne Rose (born 1999),Canadian professional soccer player
Deanne Criswell,American emergency management officer
Deanne Soza (born 2001),American artistic gymnast

See also
Deane (disambiguation)
Deanna

English feminine given names